Normanton is an amateur rugby league club based in Normanton, a small town within the City of Wakefield in West Yorkshire, England.

The club joined the Northern Union in 1898–99 and played for a total of five seasons until 1905–06.
They played at the Mopsey Garth ground.

The club started out as founder members of the Yorkshire Senior Competition Division 2 (East), and moved as the competition structures changed.

History 

The first rugby club in Normanton was established in 1879 and used the Midland Hotel as its base.

Together with 14 other clubs including Hull Kingston Rovers and Keighley, Normanton were one of the founders of the third division of the Yorkshire Senior Competition, then known as the Yorkshire Rugby Union Intermediate Competition, in 1893.

After the Great Schism in 1895, Normanton remained true to the Rugby Football Union. until eventually following the majority of other Yorkshire clubs and joining the Northern Union in 1898. They, together with Eastmoor, Featherstone Rovers, Goole, Hull Kingston Rovers, Kinsley, Outwood Parish Church, Ripon, Rothwell and York, were among the founders of the Yorkshire Second Competition (Eastern Section).

In season 1899–1900 Normanton finished top of this league, and on the way beat Leeds in the first round of the Challenge Cup before losing to Batley in the second round.

In 1901–02 Normanton were elected into the Yorkshire Senior Competition where they finished a creditable 8th, one place above local rivals Castleford out of 14.

At the end of the 1901–02 season, the County Leagues elected 18 teams to join the new Division 2 (7 from Lancashire and 10 from Yorkshire and new member South Shields) with the existing second competition scrapped.

1901–02 Normanton, being one of the fortunate ones, joined the new second division and finished 12th out of 18 teams. In 1903–04 Normanton continued to play in the Second division, but struggled and finished in 17th and bottom place. The 1904–05 season was a little better and Normanton managed to finish 10th out of 14; one place below Castleford.

1905–06 saw the Rugby League revert to one single division of 31 clubs. Normanton finished in 26th position but in doing so ended the season in financial difficulties. The Northern Union allowed Millom and Normanton to cancel their game due to the cost of travelling. At the end of the season Normanton was forced to fold. (Millom, who finished one position below Normanton in 27th place also folded at the end of the season due to financial difficulties).

New club 

A new club, Hopetown Rovers, was quickly formed in time for the new season. The new club joined the Wakefield and Dewsbury District League, using the Huntsman Inn as a base and playing on Normanton Common. Thus continuing the existence of a rugby league club in the town. The club later went through several transitions and name change including to Normanton ARLFC and finally Normanton Knights ARLFC in the early 1980s

Club league record 

The league positions for Normanton for the five years in which they played semi-professional rugby league are given in the following table :-

Heading Abbreviations
RL = Single Division; Pl = Games played; W = Win; D = Draw; L = Lose; PF = Points for; PA = Points against; Diff = Points difference (+ or -); Pts = League points
% Pts = A percentage system was used to determine league positions due to clubs playing varying number of fixtures and against different opponents 
League points: for win = 2; for draw = 1; for loss = 0.

Several fixtures and results 
The following are just a few of Normanton’s fixtures during the five season (and other times) in which they played semi-professional rugby league :-

Notes and comments 

1 - This was one of the games played on the Inaugural Saturday of the new league

2 - Lowerhouse Lane is the original site of the current ground used by Widnes. It was renamed Naughton Park in 1932 in honour of club secretary, Tom Naughton - and later renamed Halton Stadium after being completely rebuilt in 1997.
3 - Wigan became sub-tenants of Springfield Park, which they shared with Wigan United AFC, playing their first game there on 14 September 1901 at which a crowd of 4,000 saw them beat Morecambe 12–0, and the last game on 28 April 1902 when Wigan beat the Rest of Lancashire Senior Competition. A temporary ground was necessary to span the period between moving from Folly Fields and the new ground at Central Park being constructed.

Normanton players who have turned professional
The following is an incomplete list of Normanton players who have turned professional.

 Roy Appleyard (Castleford)
 Danny Beach  (Featherstone Rovers)
 Graham Blakeway (Castleford)
 Dean Blankley (Castleford)
 Doug Bradley (Doncaster)
 Mick Brennan (Halifax)
 Bill Bryant (Castleford)
 Eddie Bryant (Castleford)
 John Burke (Leeds)
 Lee Butterfield (Bramley Buffaloes)
 Michael Cain (Bramley Buffaloes)
 Dave Callon (Halifax)
 Stuart Carlton (Wakefield Trinity Wildcats)
 Darren Carter (Wakefield Trinity)
 Mick Copley (Batley Bulldogs)
 Allan Davies (Huddersfield Giants)
 Craig Davies (Sheffield Eagles)
 Frank Davies (Huddersfield)
 Phil Davies (Halifax)
 Tom Davies (Huddersfield Giants)
 Graham Evans (Huddersfield Giants)
 Ted Fergeson (Halifax)
 Jus Fisher (Bramley Buffaloes)
 Bernard Golby (Batley Bulldogs)
 Bernard Gray (Dewsbury Rams)
 xBarry Griffiths (Hull)
 Dave Hammond (Huddersfield Giants)
 Richard Hampshire (Bramley Buffaloes)
 Raymond Handscombe (Leeds Rhinos)
 David "Dave" Hartley (Featherstone Rovers)
 Paul Hayden (Featherstone Rovers)
 Paul Hicks (Wakefield Trinity Wildcats)
 Graham Hirst (Halifax)
 Chris Kelly (Bramley Buffaloes)
 Jamie Langley (Bradford Bulls)
 John Langley (Leeds Rhinos)
 Ken Loxton (Huddersfield)
 Harry Marney (Halifax)
 Kev Martin (Sheffield Eagles)
 Alan Maskill (Hunslet Hawks)
 Ian Morse (Bramley Buffaloes)
 Bob Pritchard (Wakefield Trinity Wildcats)
 Terry Riches (Bradford Bulls)
 John Sanderson (Halifax)
 Cliff Sherratt (Bramley Buffaloes)
 Martin Slater (Castleford)
 Richard Slater (Wakefield Trinity Wildcats)
 Richard Stead (Bramley Buffaloes)
 Jason Timmins (Wakefield Trinity Wildcats)
 David Topliss (Wakefield Trinity)
 Bernard Ward (Wakefield Trinity Wildcats)
 Mark Webster (Wakefield Trinity Wildcats)
 Ben Westwood (Wakefield Trinity Wildcats)
 Steve Westwood (Doncaster)

Notable players
Voyce of Normanton played in The Rest's 5-7 defeat by Leeds in the 1901–02 Yorkshire Senior Competition Champions versus The Rest match at Headingley Stadium on Saturday 19 April 1902.

See also 
List of defunct rugby league clubs

References

External links 

Normanton Knights ARLFC website
Normanton Knights History
Eastmoor Dragons ARLFC - Club Info - History 2

Rugby league teams in West Yorkshire
Sport in the City of Wakefield
Rugby clubs established in 1879
1879 establishments in England
English rugby league teams
Normanton, West Yorkshire